Asaphodes is a genus of moths in the family Geometridae erected by Edward Meyrick in 1885. This genus is endemic to New Zealand and species within this genus are found throughout New Zealand including the North, South and Stewart / Rakiura Islands.

Taxonomy 
This genus was first described by Edward Meyrick in 1885 as a replacement name for the genus Thyone. Meyrick gave more detail in 1886 as well as in 1892. This genus was reinterpreted by J. S. Dugdale in 1971. Dugdale stated that the species within this genus 

The type species of this genus is Asaphodes abrogata, by original monotypy.

Description
Meyrick described this genus as follows:

Distribution 
This genus is endemic to New Zealand and species within this genus are found throughout New Zealand including in the North, South and Stewart Island / Rakiura Islands.

Species
The species found in the genus Asaphodes include:

 Asaphodes abrogata (Walker 1862)
 Asaphodes adonis (Hudson, 1898)
 Asaphodes aegrota (Butler, 1879)
 Asaphodes albalineata (Philpott, 1915)
 Asaphodes aphelias (Prout, 1939)
 Asaphodes beata (Butler, 1877)
 Asaphodes camelias (Meyrick, 1888)
 Asaphodes campbellensis (Dugdale, 1964)
 Asaphodes cataphracta (Meyrick, 1883)
 Asaphodes chionogramma (Meyrick, 1883)
 Asaphodes chlamydota (Meyrick, 1883)
 Asaphodes chlorocapna (Meyrick, 1925)
 Asaphodes cinnabari (Howes, 1912)
 Asaphodes citroena (Clarke, 1934)
 Asaphodes clarata (Walker, 1862)
 Asaphodes cosmodora (Meyrick, 1888)
 Asaphodes declarata (Prout, 1914)
 Asaphodes dionysias (Meyrick, 1907)
 Asaphodes exoriens (Prout, 1912)
 Asaphodes frivola (Meyrick, 1913)
 Asaphodes glaciata (Hudson, 1925)
 Asaphodes helias (Meyrick, 1883)
 Asaphodes ida (Clarke, 1926)
 Asaphodes imperfecta (Philpott, 1905)
 Asaphodes limonodes (Meyrick, 1888)
 Asaphodes mnesichola (Meyrick, 1888)
 Asaphodes nephelias (Meyrick, 1883)
 Asaphodes obarata (Felder & Rogenhofer, 1875)
 Asaphodes omichlias (Meyrick, 1883)
 Asaphodes oraria (Philpott, 1903)
 Asaphodes oxyptera (Hudson, 1909)
 Asaphodes periphaea (Meyrick, 1905)
 Asaphodes philpotti (Prout, 1927)
 Asaphodes prasinias (Meyrick, 1883)
 Asaphodes prymnaea (Meyrick, 1911)
 Asaphodes recta (Philpott, 1905)
 Asaphodes sericodes (Meyrick, 1915)
 Asaphodes stephanitis Meyrick, 1907
 Asaphodes stinaria (Guenee, 1868)

References

Larentiinae
Geometridae genera